Israel Romero Ospino or popularly known as "El Pollo Isra" (Born in Villanueva, La Guajira in 1955) is a Colombian vallenato musician, composer and accordionist. Romero was along Rafael Orozco Maestre the founder of the vallenato group Binomio de Oro de América.

Discography
From 1977 to 1991 the Binomio de Oro recorded 20 albums not counting special contributions to other artist of the "Fiesta Vallenata" compilations, interrupted with the death of lead singer Rafael Orozco.

1977 - Binomio de Oro (1977 album)
1977 - Por lo Alto
1978 - Enamorado como Siempre
1978 - Los Elegidos (album)
1979 - Super Vallenato
1980 - Clase aparte
1980 - De Cache
1981 - 5 Años de Oro
1982 - Festival Vallenato
1983 - Fuera de Serie
1983 - Mucha Calidad
1984 - Somos Vallenato
1985 - Superior
1986 - Binomio de Oro
1987 - En Concierto
1988 - Internacional
1989 - De Exportación
1990 - De Fiesta con el Binomio
1991 - Por Siempre
1991 - De América

Singer Gabriel "El Gaby" García replaced Orozco

1993 - Todo Corazón
1994 - De la Mano con el Pueblo
1995 - Lo Nuestro

Jean Carlos Centeno and Jorge Celedon became lead singers

1996 - A su Gusto
1997 - Seguimos por lo Alto
1998 - 2000
1999 - Más cerca de tí

In 1999 singer Jorge Celedon quits the group, replaced by Junior Santiago.

2000 - Difícil de Igualar
2001 - Haciendo Historia
2003 - Que Viva el Vallenato
2004 - En todo su Esplendor
2005 - Grafiti de Amor
2006 - Impredecible

References

1954 births
Living people
Colombian accordionists
Vallenato musicians